The 1996 Buffalo Bulls football team represented the University at Buffalo in the 1996 NCAA Division I-AA football season. The Bulls offense scored 271 points while the defense allowed 241 points.

Schedule

References

Buffalo
Buffalo Bulls football seasons
Buffalo Bulls football